Guo Jing (born 24 February 1997) is a Chinese footballer currently playing as a defender for Qingdao Youth Island.

Club career
Guo Jing would play for the Guangzhou Evergrande youth team before he was loaned out to second tier football club Meizhou Hakka at the beginning of the 2017 league season to start his senior career. On 19 April 2017, Guo would make his senior debut against Suzhou Dongwu in a second round Chinese FA Cup match that ended in a 2-0 defeat. This was followed by his first league game for the club on 10 June 2017 against Beijing Enterprises in a 1-0 defeat. At the end of the season he would return Guangzhou and was promoted to their senior team, however after a whole season he was unable to break into the first team and was loaned out to another second tier club in Inner Mongolia Zhongyou at the beginning of the 2019 league season where he went on to make his debut for the club in a league game against Beijing Sport University in a 2-0 victory on 31 March 2019.

Career statistics

References

External links

1997 births
Living people
Chinese footballers
China youth international footballers
Chinese expatriate footballers
Association football defenders
China League One players
Chinese Super League players
Guangzhou F.C. players
Meizhou Hakka F.C. players
Inner Mongolia Zhongyou F.C. players
Henan Songshan Longmen F.C. players
Chinese expatriate sportspeople in Portugal
Expatriate footballers in Portugal
21st-century Chinese people